The 2022 Major League Baseball postseason was the postseason tournament of Major League Baseball (MLB) for the 2022 season. This was the first edition of the postseason since 2012 to have a new format, as it has been expanded to include six teams per league. The top two seeds of the American and National leagues receive first-round byes into the Division Series, and the worst-division winner is the third seed in their respective league. The three Wild Card teams are the fourth, fifth and sixth seeds. The third seed hosts the sixth seed in a best-of-three Wild Card series, and the fourth seed does the same with the fifth seed. The postseason started on Friday, October 7, two days after the end of the regular season.

The winners of the Wild Card series then face the top two seeds from each league in the best-of-five Division Series (i.e. the one seed will face the fourth/fifth seed winner and the two seed will face the third/sixth seed winner). The winners of the League Division Series (LDS) will then move on to the best-of-seven League Championship Series (LCS) to determine the pennant winners that will face each other in the World Series.

In the American League, the Houston Astros were the first team to clinch a postseason spot, with this being their seventh appearance in the last eight seasons. The New York Yankees also clinched their seventh postseason berth in the past eight years, while the now-Cleveland Guardians clinched their fifth postseason berth in the past seven seasons. The Toronto Blue Jays also returned, as they clinched their second postseason appearance in the past three years. The Tampa Bay Rays returned for the fourth year in a row, and the Seattle Mariners ended two decades of futility by clinching their first postseason berth since 2001, ending what was the longest active postseason drought in the American League and all of the four major North American sports leagues.

In the National League, the Los Angeles Dodgers became the first team to clinch a postseason spot in the MLB overall, marking their tenth straight appearance. The Dodgers became the first team to make ten consecutive postseason appearances since the Yankees did so from 1998 to 2007. On September 19, the New York Mets clinched their third postseason berth in the past eight years and first overall since 2016, marking the first time since 2015 that both New York City teams appeared in the postseason. The defending World Series champion Atlanta Braves clinched their fifth straight postseason berth on September 20. The St. Louis Cardinals clinched the NL Central title on September 27, which was their first division title since 2019 and their fourth consecutive postseason appearance. The San Diego Padres clinched their second postseason berth in the past three years on October 2. On October 3, the Philadelphia Phillies clinched their first postseason berth since 2011, ending what was also the longest active postseason drought in the National League. 

The Wild Card Series saw three of the lower seeds advanced to the next round, while the Division Series saw the top two seeds in the National League win only one game each.

The postseason ended on November 5, with the Astros defeating the Phillies in six games in the World Series. It was the Astros' second championship in franchise history, and the latest date for a World Series game on record.

Playoff seeds
Major League Baseball tie-breaking procedures were revised this season to use head-to-head records to break any ties at the end of the regular season, instead of playing tiebreaker games. Under the new format, the top two seeds in each league earned a first-round bye into the LDS. The three wild card teams are the fourth, fifth, and sixth seeds respectively. While the third-seeded team hosts the sixth seed, the fourth seed hosts the fifth seed.

The following teams qualified for the postseason:

American League
 Houston Astros – AL West champions, best record in AL, 106–56
 New York Yankees – AL East champions, 99–63
 Cleveland Guardians – AL Central champions, 92–70
 Toronto Blue Jays – 92–70
 Seattle Mariners – 90–72
 Tampa Bay Rays – 86–76

National League
 Los Angeles Dodgers – NL West champions, best record NL, best record in baseball, 111–51
 Atlanta Braves – NL East champions, 101–61 (10–9 head-to-head vs. NYM)
 St. Louis Cardinals – NL Central champions, 93–69
 New York Mets – 101–61 (9–10 head-to-head vs. ATL)
 San Diego Padres – 89–73
 Philadelphia Phillies – 87–75

Playoff bracket

American League Wild Card Series

(3) Cleveland Guardians vs. (6) Tampa Bay Rays

This was the second postseason meeting between the Rays and Guardians. The only other meeting was in the 2013 American League Wild Card Game, in which the Rays won in a shutout in Cleveland.

The Guardians swept the Rays to advance to the ALDS for the first time since 2018, capped off by a walk-off home run by Oscar González in the fifteenth inning of Game 2.

(4) Toronto Blue Jays vs. (5) Seattle Mariners

This was the first postseason meeting between the Mariners and the Blue Jays, the two American League expansion teams in 1977. This was the first postseason series appearance for the Mariners in 21 years, when they won the ALDS over Cleveland in five games, then lost to the eventual AL champion New York Yankees in five games in the ALCS.

The Mariners swept the Blue Jays to advance to the ALDS for the first time since 2001. The Mariners shut out the Blue Jays in Game 1 and in Game 2, the Blue Jays had a 8–1 lead after five innings, but two four-run innings enabled an unprecedented postseason comeback by the Mariners.

National League Wild Card Series

(3) St. Louis Cardinals vs. (6) Philadelphia Phillies 

This was the second postseason meeting between the Cardinals and Phillies. The only other meeting was the 2011 NLDS, which was won by St. Louis in five games en route to a World Series title.

In Game 1, the Phillies were down 2–0 in the top of the 9th inning, but scored 6 runs, making an improbable comeback.

The Phillies swept the Cardinals to return to the NLDS for the first time since 2011. This marked the third postseason in a row in which the Cardinals were eliminated in the Wild Card round.

(4) New York Mets vs. (5) San Diego Padres

This was the first postseason meeting between the Mets and Padres. The Padres defeated the Mets in three games to advance to the NLDS for the second time in three years. This was the first time in history a 100 or more win team failed to make it to the division series since the division series’s implementation back in 1995.

The Padres blew out the Mets in Game 1 thanks to a stellar pitching performance from Yu Darvish, and while the Mets evened the series in Game 2, were shut out 6-0 in Game 3.

American League Division Series

(1) Houston Astros vs. (5) Seattle Mariners

This was the first postseason meeting between the Mariners and Astros. This marked the first appearance in the ALDS for the Mariners since 2001, which they won over the Cleveland Indians in five games before falling to the New York Yankees in the ALCS.

The Astros swept the Mariners to return to the ALCS for the sixth year in a row. Despite ending in a sweep, each game of the series was decided by two runs or less. In Game 1, the Mariners held a 7–5 lead going into the bottom of the ninth until Houston's Yordan Alvarez hit a walk-off three-run home run to take Game 1 for the Astros. In Game 2, the Mariners again held a late lead, until Alvarez hit a two-run home run to put the Astros in the lead for good. When the series moved to Seattle for Game 3, the game remained scoreless through 17 innings, setting a new MLB record for the postseason. In the top of the 18th inning, Houston's Jeremy Peña hit a solo home run to give the Astros a 1–0 lead. The Astros then closed out the series in the bottom of the inning.

(2) New York Yankees vs. (3) Cleveland Guardians

 Game 2 was originally scheduled for October 13 at 7:37pm (EDT), but was postponed to the following day at 1:07pm due to the forecast of sustained inclement weather.

 Game 5 was originally scheduled for October 17 at 7:07pm (EDT), but was postponed  to the following day at 4:07pm due to rain.

This was the sixth postseason meeting between the Yankees and the Guardians. In their previous five meetings, Cleveland defeated the Yankees in the ALDS in 1997 and 2007, while the Yankees prevailed against them in the ALCS in 1998, the ALDS in 2017, and the Wild Card series in 2020.

The Yankees defeated the Guardians in five games to advance to the ALCS for the third time in six years. The first two games at Yankee Stadium were split by both teams. When the series shifted to Cleveland for Game 3, the Yankees held a 5–3 lead in the bottom of the ninth inning, until the Guardians rallied with three runs to win and go up 2–1 in the series. The Yankees won Game 4 by a 4–2 score to avoid elimination and then closed out the series with a 5–1 victory in Game 5 at Yankee Stadium.

National League Division Series

(1) Los Angeles Dodgers vs. (5) San Diego Padres

 Game 4 was originally scheduled for October 15 at 9:07pm (EDT), but was postponed to 9:38pm the same day due to the forecast of sustained inclement weather.

This was the second postseason meeting in the Dodgers–Padres rivalry. The previous meeting in the NLDS in 2020 was won by the Dodgers in a sweep en route to a World Series title.

In a significant upset given their regular season win differential, the 89-win Padres defeated the 111-win Dodgers in four games to advance to the NLCS for the first time since 1998. 

The Dodgers took Game 1 in Los Angeles by a 5–3 score, but the Padres responded with a 5–3 victory of their own in Game 2 to even the series. When the series moved to San Diego for Game 3, the Padres narrowly took Game 3 thanks to stellar pitching performances from Blake Snell and Josh Hader to take a 2–1 series lead. In Game 4, the Dodgers jumped out to an early lead and scored one more in the top of the seventh inning to go up 3–0. However, the Padres rallied with five unanswered runs in the bottom of the inning to complete the upset series win.

(2) Atlanta Braves vs. (6) Philadelphia Phillies

 The start for Game 2 was delayed due to rain on October 12. It was originally scheduled to be played at 4:35pm (EDT) but was delayed to 7:30pm (EDT) due to the forecast of sustained inclement weather.

This was the second postseason meeting between the Braves and Phillies. They previously met in the NLCS in 1993, which was won by the Phillies in six games before they fell in the World Series that year.

The Phillies upset the defending World Series champion Braves in four games to return to the NLCS for the first time since 2010. The Phillies stole a high-scoring Game 1 on the road in Atlanta, while the Braves responded with a 3–0 shutout in Game 2 to even the series. However, when the series moved to Philadelphia, the Phillies blew out the Braves in Games 3 and 4 to complete an improbable upset.

American League Championship Series

(1) Houston Astros vs. (2) New York Yankees

 Game 4 was originally scheduled for October 23 at 7:07pm (EDT), but was postponed to 8:54pm the same day due to the forecast of sustained inclement weather.

This was the fourth postseason meeting between the Astros and Yankees. The previous three meetings (2015, 2017, 2019) were won by the Astros. This was the sixth straight appearance in the ALCS for the Astros, dating back to 2017.

The Astros swept the Yankees to return to the World Series for the fourth time in six years (in the process denying a rematch of the 2009 World Series). The Astros took Game 1 thanks to a solid pitching performance by Justin Verlander, and in Game 2 the Astros held off a late Yankees rally to go up 2–0 in the series headed to the Bronx. The Astros shut out the Yankees in Game 3, 5–0, to go up 3–0 in the series. The Yankees attempted to avoid a sweep in Game 4 as they led going into the seventh inning, however, it was short-lived as Houston’s Yordan Alvarez and Alex Bregman both hit RBI singles to put the Astros in the lead for good, securing the pennant.

This was the first time the Yankees were swept in the ALCS since 2012. With the win, the Astros became the fourth team in MLB history to win their first seven postseason games, joining the 1976 Cincinnati Reds, the 2007 Colorado Rockies, and the 2014 Kansas City Royals. Astros rookie Jeremy Peña was named the ALCS MVP.

National League Championship Series

(5) San Diego Padres vs. (6) Philadelphia Phillies

This was the first postseason meeting between the Padres and Phillies. The Padres previously won their past two appearances in the NLCS – in 1984 and 1998. The last time the Phillies appeared in the NLCS was in 2010, where they were upset by the eventual World Series champion San Francisco Giants. The Phillies defeated the Padres in five games to return to the World Series for the first time since 2009.

Game 1 was a pitcher’s duel between Philadelphia’s Zack Wheeler and San Diego’s Yu Darvish. The Phillies took Game 1 in a 2–0 shutout. The Padres rallied from an early deficit in Game 2 to tie the series with an 8–5 victory. When the series shifted to Philadelphia for Game 3, the Phillies won by a 4–2 score to take a 2–1 series lead.

Game 4 was an offensive duel - the Padres jumped out to an early 4–0 lead in the top of the first, but the Phillies cut the lead to one in the bottom of the inning. The Phillies tied the game in the bottom of the fourth, while San Diego’s Juan Soto hit a two-run home run to regain the lead in the top of the fifth. In the bottom of the inning, Philadelphia’s Rhys Hoskins tied the game with a two-run home run of his own, followed by an RBI double by Bryce Harper, as well as a single by Nick Castellanos which put the Phillies in the lead for good. The Phillies won 10–6 to go up 3–1 in the series. In Game 5, the Phillies jumped to an early 2–0 lead. Even though the Padres took the lead in the top of the seventh, the Phillies scored two more unanswered runs to take the lead for good and secure the pennant. 

With the win, the Phillies became the first sixth-seeded team in MLB history to reach the World Series, due to the new playoff format that started with this postseason. Phillies Bryce Harper was named NLCS MVP.

During this series, brothers Aaron Nola of the Phillies, and Austin Nola of the Padres became the first pair of brothers to face each other as pitcher and batter in the MLB postseason.

2022 World Series

(AL1) Houston Astros vs. (NL6) Philadelphia Phillies

 Game 3, originally scheduled for October 31, was postponed due to the forecast rain.  All games were moved one day to accommodate the postponement.

This was the second postseason meeting between the Astros and Phillies. They previously met in the NLCS in the 1980 postseason, which was won by the Phillies in five games en route to their first World Series title. The Astros redeemed themselves after their scandal-plagued World Series title in 2017, as they defeated the Phillies in six games to win their second championship in franchise history.

In Game 1, Kyle Tucker of the Astros hit a three-run home run to put Houston up 5–0 going into the top of the fourth inning. The Phillies cut the Astros' lead to two with a three-run fourth inning, and J. T. Realmuto chased Justin Verlander from the mound as he drove in two runs to tie the game with an RBI double. The game remained tied after the ninth, and in the top of the tenth, Realmuto hit a solo home run off Luis García to put the Phillies in the lead for good. By winning Game 1, the Phillies became the first team since the 2002 Angels to overcome a five-run deficit to win a World Series game. In Game 2, Alex Bregman hit a two-run home run to put the Astros up 5–0 again in the fifth inning, but were able to maintain the lead as the Astros' bullpen held the Phillies to just two runs to even the series headed to Philadelphia. In Game 3, the Phillies blew out the Astros, 7–0, to take a 2–1 series lead, and became the fourth team in World Series history to hit five home runs in a single game, joining the 1928 Yankees, 1989 Athletics, and 2017 Astros.

However, their lead would not hold. In Game 4, the Astros made Major League Baseball history, as pitchers Cristian Javier, Bryan Abreu, Rafael Montero and Ryan Pressly helped the Astros pitch the first combined no-hitter in World Series history. It was the first World Series no-hitter since Don Larsen's perfect game for the Yankees in the 1956 World Series, and the first postseason no-hitter since 2010, when Roy Halladay threw a no-hitter for the Phillies in Game 1 of the NLDS. In Game 5, the Astros held off a late rally by the Phillies to win by one run and take a 3–2 series lead headed back to Houston, giving Justin Verlander his first victory in a World Series game after previously losing six. In Game 6, the Phillies struck first in the top of the sixth, when Kyle Schwarber hit a solo home run. However, the Astros responded in the bottom of the inning, as Yordan Alvarez hit a three-run home run to put the Astros in the lead, and then Christian Vázquez hit an RBI single to score Bregman. The Astros then closed out the series in the top of the ninth.

The Astros became the first team to win the World Series at home since the Boston Red Sox did so in 2013. The Phillies' record in the World Series fell to 2–6 after the loss. Rookie Jeremy Peña was named World Series MVP.

Notes
This was the first time the Seattle Mariners made the postseason since 2001.

Broadcasting

Television coverage
For the postseason, ESPN networks broadcast the Wild Card round; due to logistical concerns (especially with the fluctuating placements of teams in the standings during the final games of the regular season), the network employed remote production for the Padres/Mets and Mariners/Blue Jays series. The latter series employed a variant of the "enhanced world feed" model used in the 2020 season, with commentators and other selected staff on-site at Rogers Centre, but using video feeds from the Sportsnet production.

Fox Sports broadcast the National League Division Series, Championship Series, and for the 23rd consecutive season, the World Series; while TBS broadcasts the American League Division Series and Championship Series. Spanish-language broadcasts of all ALDS and ALCS games will air on MLB Network.

Radio 
ESPN Radio aired the entire Major League Baseball postseason.

Most watched playoff games

Sources:

References

External links
 Major League Baseball Standings and Expanded Standings – 2022

 
Major League Baseball postseason